Le Huitième Art et la Manière , is a French comedy film from 1952, directed by Maurice Regamey, written by Armand Jammot, starring Christian Alers and Louis de Funès.

Cast 
 Christian Alers : Un présentateur
 Luc Andrieux : Le bruiteur
 Georgette Anys : L'épouse fan de radio
 Christian Argentin : Le professeur inventeur
 Henri Bosc : Le savant MacLoyd dans le feuilleton
 André Bourillon : Le journaliste sportif
 Alain Bouvette : Un speaker
 Claude Castaing : Lui-même
 Jacques Chabannes : Lui-même
 André Claveau : Lui-même
 Georges de Caunes : Lui-même
 Louis de Funès : Le mari fan de radio
 André Cerf
 Jacqueline Dufranne
 Michel Flamme

References

External links 
 
 Le Huitième art et la manière (1952) at the Films de France

1952 films
French comedy films
1950s French-language films
French black-and-white films
Films directed by Maurice Régamey
1952 comedy films
1950s French films